Bob Scarpitto is a former American college and professional football player.  A halfback, flanker and punter, he played college football at the University of Notre Dame, and played professionally in the American Football League for the San Diego Chargers in 1961, for the Denver Broncos from 1962 through 1967, and then for the AFL's Boston Patriots in 1968.  He was an American Football League All-Star in 1966.  

's NFL off-season, Bob Scarpitto held at least 3 Broncos franchise records, including:
 Most punts in a season (105 in 1967)
 Most punts in a game (12 on 1967-09-10 @OAK; tied with 2 others)
 Most punt yards in a game (565 on 1967-09-10 @OAK)

Scarpitto played high school football at Rahway High School.

See also
Other American Football League players

References

Denver Broncos (AFL) players
San Diego Chargers players
Boston Patriots players
American Football League All-Star players
Notre Dame Fighting Irish football players
Players of American football from New Jersey
American Football League All-Time Team
Sportspeople from Rahway, New Jersey
Rahway High School alumni
Living people
1939 births
American Football League players